Arkansas Highway 292 (AR 292, Hwy. 292) is an east–west state highway in Johnson County. The route runs  from Arkansas Highway 21 east to Highway 123/Highway 164 near Hagarville. The route does not run concurrent with any other state highways.

Route description
The route begins at Highway 21 north of Clarksville at Ludwig and runs due east. After , the highway intersects Highway 818 and continues east before ending at Highway 123/Highway 164 near Hagarville.

Major intersections

References

External links

292
Transportation in Johnson County, Arkansas